An anchorite (feminine form anchoress) is a Christian person who lives in strict physical separation from secular society.

Anchorite or Anchoress may also refer to:

 The Anchorite, a 1976 Spanish film
 HMS Anchorite (P422), a Royal Navy submarine of the Second A Class
 Anchorite, a kind of Azalea (Glenn Dale hybrid)
 Anchorite, a member of the Aldor religious order in World of Warcraft
 Anchoress (film), a 1993 British film
 The Anchoress (book), a 2015 novel
 The Anchoress (musician), an indie rock act